The 2015 BWF Super Series Finals is the final competition of the 2015 BWF Super Series. It will be held from December 9 to December 13 in Dubai, United Arab Emirates.

Representatives by nation

§: Zhang Nan from China was the only players who played in two categories (men's doubles and mixed doubles), while Zhao Yunlei from China and Christinna Pedersen from Denmark were the players who played in two categories (women's doubles and mixed doubles).

Performance by nation

Men's singles

Seeds

Withdrawn

Group A

Group B

Finals

Women's singles

Seeds

Group A

Group B

Finals

Men's doubles

Seeds

Group A

Group B

Finals

Women's doubles

Seeds

Withdrawn

Group A

Group B

Finals

Mixed doubles

Seeds

Group A

Group B

Finals

References

External links
Official website

Super Series Finals
Sports competitions in Dubai
International sports competitions hosted by the United Arab Emirates
2015 in Emirati sport
BWF Super Series Finals
Badminton tournaments in the United Arab Emirates